South Bentinck Arm is a  long side-inlet of Dean Channel in the Central Coast region of British Columbia, Canada. At the north end of the arm it meets the North Bentinck Arm and then the Dean Channel before flowing into the Burke Channel.

Rivers
The arm is fed by the Taleomey River, which flows from the Taleomey Glacier just north of the Monarch Icefield. The Taleomy Indian Reserve No. 3 lies on the west side of the rivers mouth next to the Taleomey Narrows.

Just to the north is the Noeick River and the locality of South Bentinck on the east shore of the inlet.

Name origin
South and North Bentinck Arms were named by George Vancouver, as "Bentinck Arms", in 1793, after the House of Portland; the Duke of Portland at the time was William Henry Cavendish Bentinck.

References

Fjords of British Columbia
History of British Columbia
Central Coast of British Columbia
Inlets of British Columbia